Prokunino is a rural locality (a village) in Leskovskoye Rural Settlement, Vologodsky District, Vologda Oblast, Russia. The population was 2 as of 2002.

Geography 
The distance to Vologda is 20 km, to Leskovo is 5 km.

References 

Rural localities in Vologodsky District